Time Thread is a studio album by Japanese jazz pianist Makoto Ozone and American jazz vibraphonist Gary Burton. This collaboration album was released on  via Verve Records.

Track listing

Personnel
Band
Makoto Ozone – piano, producer
Gary Burton – vibraphone

Production
Makoto Shinohara – producer 
Greg Calbi – mastering
Brett Mayer – mixing
Joe Ferla – mixing, engineering
Akihiro Nishimura – recording

References

2013 albums
Gary Burton albums
Verve Records albums
Collaborative albums